Scamboneura is a genus of true crane flies; the majority of species are found in the Philippines.

Species
S. banahaoensis Alexander, 1931
S. calianensis Alexander, 1931
S. citridorsum Alexander, 1931
S. claggi Alexander, 1931
S. curtistyla Alexander, 1971
S. davaoensis Alexander, 1931
S. dotata Osten Sacken, 1882
S. faceta Alexander, 1927
S. hirtisternata Alexander, 1930
S. minahasa Alexander, 1934
S. mindanaoensis Alexander, 1931
S. nigrodorsalis Alexander, 1947
S. nigrotergata Alexander, 1931
S. opacinotum Alexander, 1931
S. plumbea Alexander, 1922
S. primaeva Alexander, 1929
S. primogenia Alexander, 1931
S. psarophanes Alexander, 1927
S. quadrata de Meijere, 1914
S. subdotata Alexander, 1931
S. subfaceta Alexander, 1934
S. subtransversa Alexander, 1931
S. sumatrensis Alexander, 1937
S. tagensis Alexander, 1961
S. vittifrons (Walker, 1860)
S. vittivertex Alexander, 1930

References

Tipulidae
Diptera of Australasia
Diptera of Asia
Taxa named by Carl Robert Osten-Sacken